26th Army may refer to:

26th Army (People's Republic of China)
26th Army (Soviet Union)